This is a list of the 71 Members of Parliament (MPs) elected to the House of Commons of the United Kingdom by Scottish constituencies for the Forty-eighth parliament of the United Kingdom (1979 to 1983) at the 1979 United Kingdom general election.

Composition at election

Composition at dissolusion

List

By-elections 

 1980 Glasgow Central By-Election, Bob McTaggart, Labour
1982 Glasgow Hillhead By-election, Roy Jenkins, SDP/Alliance
1982 Coatbridge and Airdrie By-election, Thomas Clarke, Labour
1982 Glasgow Queen's Park By-election, Helen McElhone, Labour

See also 

 Lists of MPs for constituencies in Scotland

Lists of UK MPs 1979–1983
Lists of MPs for constituencies in Scotland
1979 United Kingdom general election